The Rural Representative elections are the quadrennial elections to elect the rural representatives which consist of the village representatives and kaifong representatives in the New Territories of Hong Kong. The rural representatives are responsible for electing the executive committees of their respective rural committees in which to elect the members of the Heung Yee Kuk.

Background
The Rural community in the New Territories has all the time had its own village representative elections. The previous electoral systems for a village or a group of villages came up around the end of World War II, in which they were conducted privately on a clan basis. All the candidates and electors were the indigenous inhabitants, ie person who could establish their patrilineal descent from a resident of a village that was in existence before the 1898 Convention for the Extension of Hong Kong Territory.

In 1994, the Heung Yee Kuk drew up a set of "Model Rules" for the elections of some 700 villages, which were held every four years. The appointment of the elected village representatives had to be approved by the Secretary for Home Affairs. The "Model rules" system prevailed until 1999 when two non-indigenous inhabitants, Chan Wah of Po Toi O in Sai Kung and Tse Kwan-sang of Shek Wu Tong in Yuen Long challenged the validity of the electoral arrangements in their villages by judicial review proceedings. Chan was denied the right to vote even though he married an indigenous inhabitants while Tse was denied the right to stand. The cases were eventually heard by the Court of Final Appeal in December 2000, which ruled that the electoral arrangements were inconsistent with the Hong Kong Bill of Rights Ordinance while those in Po Toi O were also inconsistent with the Sex Discrimination Ordinance. 

In view of the rulings, there were calls on the government to bring village representative elections under a statutory framework. In 2003, the government enacted the Village Representative Election Ordinance (Cap. 576), which was later renamed as Rural Representative Election Ordinance in 2014. In the proposal, the election would be held in a electoral system of two types of village representatives which represent both the indigenous and non-indigenous inhabitants. 

The Village Representative Election Ordinance (Cap. 576) was later renamed as Rural Representative Election Ordinance in 2014, which created a new type of kaifong representative which only were introduced in Cheung Chau and Peng Chau Rural Committee of the Islands District, for the electing non-village representatives to reflect views on local affairs on behalf of Cheung Chau and Peng Chau residents.

Composition
There are three different types of rural representatives. Under the village representatives, there are indigenous inhabitant representatives and resident representatives. Indigenous inhabitants are returned by the elector of indigenous inhabitants which have the exclusive power to deal with all affairs relating to traditional rights and interests of the indigenous villages, while resident representatives are to reflect view on behalf of the non-indigenous residents. Kaifong representatives only exist in Cheung Chau and Peng Chau which are elected by the market towns of the respective areas.

Elections

2003

2007

2011

2015

2019

2023

References

External links
 Rural Representative Election Official Website
 Rural Representative Election (Amendment) Ordinance 2014

Elections in Hong Kong